Psoromidium is a genus of lichens in the family Pannariaceae. It has three species. The genus was circumscribed by Scottish naturalist James Stirton in 1877, with Psoromidium wellingtonii assigned as the type species.

Species
Psoromidium aleuroides 
Psoromidium versicolor 
Psoromidium wellingtonii

References

Peltigerales
Lichen genera
Peltigerales genera
Taxa named by James Stirton
Taxa described in 1877